Dichomeris directa is a moth in the family Gelechiidae. It was described by Edward Meyrick in 1912. It is found in Venezuela.

The forewings are fuscous grey with the extreme costal edge whitish anteriorly. The stigmata is rather large, blackish, the plical directly beneath the first discal. The hindwings are rather dark grey.

References

Moths described in 1912
directa